Side effects of buspirone by incidence include:

Very common (>10% incidence)
 Dizziness/lightheadedness
 Headache
 Somnolence (sleepiness)

Common (1–10% incidence)

 Nervousness
 Insomnia
 Sleep disorder
 Disturbance in attention
 Depression
 Confusional state
 Anger
 Tachycardia (fast heart rate)
 Chest pain
 Sinusitis (nasal congestion)
 Pharyngolaryngeal pain
 Paraesthesia (tingling skin)
 Blurred vision
 Abnormal coordination
 Tremor
 Cold sweat
 Rash
 Nausea
 Abdominal pain
 Dry mouth
 Diarrhea
 Constipation
 Vomiting
 Fatigue
 Musculoskeletal pain

Uncommon (0.1–1%)

 Syncope
 Hypotension
 Hypertension
 Redness and itching of the eyes
 Altered taste
 Conjunctivitis
 Flatulence
 Anorexia
 Increased appetite
 Salivation
 Rectal bleeding
 Urinary frequency
 Urinary hesitancy
 Menstrual irregularity or spotting
 Dysuria
 Muscle cramps
 Muscle spasms
 Muscle rigidity/stiffness
 Involuntary movements
 Shortness of breath
 Chest congestion
 Changes in libido
 Oedema
 Pruritus
 Flushing
 Easy bruising
 Dry skin
 Facial oedema
 Mild increases in hepatic aminotransferases (AST, ALT)
 Weight gain
 Fever
 Roaring sensation in the head
 Weight loss
 Malaise
 Depersonalisation
 Noise intolerance
 Euphoria
 Akathisia
 Fearfulness
 Loss of interest
 Dissociative reaction

Rare (<0.1% incidence)

 Cerebrovascular accident (stroke)
 Myocardial infarction (heart attack)
 Cardiomyopathy
 Congestive heart failure
 Bradycardia
 Dysphoria
 Hallucinations
 Feelings of claustrophobia
 Cold intolerance
 Stupor
 Seizures
 Slurred speech
 Extrapyramidal symptoms including dyskinesias (acute & delayed)
 Dystonic reactions
 Cogwheel rigidity
 Emotional lability
 Psychosis
 Suicidal ideation
 Ataxias
 Transient difficulty with recall
 Serotonin syndrome
 Parkinsonism
 Restless leg syndrome
 Restlessness
 Eye pain
 Altered sense of smell
 Photophobia
 Pressure on eyes
 Inner ear abnormality
 Tunnel vision
 Galactorrhoea
 Irritable bowel syndrome
 Burning of the tongue
 Arthralgias
 Amenorrhoea (cessation of menstrual cycles)
 Enuresis
 Nocturia
 Pelvic inflammatory disease
 Urinary retention
 Hyperventilation
 Epistaxis
 Delayed ejaculation
 Impotence
 Acne
 Hair loss
 Blisters
 Thinning of nails
 Allergic reactions including urticaria, ecchymosis, angioedema
 Eosinophilia
 Leucopenia
 Thrombocytopaenia
 Excessive use of alcohol 
 Bleeding disturbance
 Loss of voice
 Hiccups
 Thyroid abnormality

References

Buspirone